Deus is the Latin word for "god" or "deity".
Latin deus and dīvus ("divine") are in turn descended from Proto-Indo-European *deiwos, "celestial" or "shining", from the same root as *Dyēus, the reconstructed chief god of the Proto-Indo-European pantheon. 

In Classical Latin, deus (feminine dea) was a general noun referring to a deity, while in technical usage a divus or diva was a figure who had become divine, such as a divinized emperor. In Late Latin, Deus came to be used mostly for the Christian God. It was inherited by the Romance languages in Galician and Portuguese Deus, Catalan and Sardinian Déu, French and Occitan Dieu, Friulian and Sicilian Diu, Italian Dio, Spanish Dios and (for the Jewish God) Ladino דייו/דיו Dio/Dyo, etc., and by the Celtic languages in Welsh Duw and Irish Dia.

Cognates
While Latin deus can be translated as and bears superficial similarity to Greek θεός theós, meaning "god", these are false cognates. In the archaic period, the initial Zeta would have been pronounced such that Attic Ζεύς would phonetically transliterate as Zdeús or Dzeús, from Proto-Hellenic *dzéus. 

By combining a form of deus with the Ancient Roman word for "father", one derives the name of the mythical Roman equivalent of Zeus: the sky god Diespiter, later called Iuppiter or Jūpiter, from Proto-Italic *djous patēr, descended from Proto-Indo-European root *Dyḗws*Pahtḗr literally meaning 'Sky Father'. From the same root is derived the Greek vocative "O father Zeus", and whence is also derived the name of the Hindu sky god Dyáuṣ Pitṛ́ (Vedic Sanskrit:), and Proto-Germanic *Tīwaz or Tius hence Old Norse Týr.

Latin Bible
Latin Deus consistently translates Greek Θεός  Theós in both the Vetus Latina and Jerome's Vulgate. In the Septuagint, Greek Theós in turn renders  Hebrew Elohim (אֱלוֹהִים, אלהים), as in Genesis 1:1:
 Masoretic Text 
 Septuagint 
 Vulgate

In theological terminology
The word de-us is the root of deity, and thereby of deism, pandeism, and polydeism, all of which are theories in which any divine figure is absent from intervening in human affairs. This curious circumstance originates from the use of the word "deism" in the 17th and 18th centuries as a contrast to the prevailing "theism", belief in an actively intervening God:

Followers of these theories, and occasionally followers of pantheism, may sometimes refer to God as "Deus" or "the Deus" to make clear that the entity being discussed is not a theistic "God". Arthur C. Clarke picks up this usage  in his novel 3001: The Final Odyssey. William Blake said of the Deists that they worship "the Deus of the Heathen, The God of This World, & the Goddess Nature, Mystery, Babylon the Great, The Druid Dragon & hidden Harlot".

In Cartesian philosophy, the phrase deus deceptor is sometimes used to discuss the possibility of an evil God that seeks to deceive us. This character is related to a skeptical argument as to how much we can really know if an evil demon were attempting to thwart our knowledge. Another is the deus otiosus ("idle god"), which is a creator god who largely retires from the world and is no longer involved in its daily operation.  A similar concept is that of the deus absconditus ("hidden god") of Thomas Aquinas. Both refer to a deity whose existence is not readily knowable by humans through either contemplation or examination of divine actions. The concept of deus otiosus often suggests a god who has grown weary from involvement in this world and who has been replaced by younger, more active gods, whereas deus absconditus suggests a god who has consciously left this world to hide elsewhere.

Latin phrases with "deus"

Nobiscum deus ("God with us") was a battle cry of the late Roman Empire and of the Byzantine Empire. The name Amadeus translates to "for love of God". The genitive/dative dei occurs in such phrases as Roman Catholic organization Opus Dei (work of God), Agnus Dei (Lamb of God) and Dei Gratia (By the Grace of God).

Agnus Dei
Deus ex machina
Deus otiosus/Deus absconditus
Deus sive Natura
Deus vult
Divs
Munificentissimus Deus
Opus Dei
Providentissimus Deus
Rector Potens, Verax Deus
Regnator omnium deus
Rerum Deus Tenax Vigor
Rex Deus
Sublimus Dei
Te Deum
Unigenitus dei filius
Vox populi, vox Dei

See also
 God (word) (the Germanic word)

References

Latin words and phrases
Names of God